Leidschendam-Voorburg is a municipality in the western Netherlands, located in the province of South Holland.

Origin
The municipality of Leidschendam-Voorburg is the result of merging the municipalities Leidschendam and Voorburg in 2002. It consists of the two towns Leidschendam and Voorburg, which grew towards each other in the first half of the 20th century. The village Stompwijk and a hamlet called Wilsveen also belong to the municipality.

Leidschendam-Voorburg abuts the city of The Hague and is often regarded as its suburb, even though it is an independent municipality. It is part of the Haaglanden conurbation. Stompwijk is still a rural village, located a few kilometres northeast of Leidschendam.

Historic town centers

Both Leidschendam and Voorburg have their own historic town center, which are decentrally situated.
Historic Leidschendam lies around the ancient locks in the Vliet canal in the eastern part of the town.
About 3 kilometers to the south is the beginning of the Herenstraat, the main street of the Voorburg town center. The center of Voorburg is mainly situated between this half a kilometer long street and the Vliet. The canal also forms the eastern border of the town. The most important buildings like Swaensteyn House, the Old Church (Oude Kerk) and Hofwijck are in or very near the Herenstraat.

Mall of the Netherlands 
Until 2019 the Leidschendam shopping mall Leidsenhage was undergoing a total makeover. The new shopping area was expanded to 117.000 square meters. The center also got a new name: "Mall of the Netherlands".

Sister cities

Leidschendam-Voorburg is twinned with:

The municipality was also twinned with Temecula in the United States from 1993 to 2019.

Transport

Public transport

Railway
Three railway stations are located within the municipality, providing links with all major cities in the Randstad. The main train station is Voorburg on The Hague - Utrecht line. This station is on the Southern edge of the town center. 
There are two stations on the Rotterdam-Amsterdam line, which are situated on the border of The Hague: Den Haag Laan van NOI (for some Intercity trains and local trains) and Den Haag Mariahoeve (only for local trains).

Light rail
Leidschendam-Voorburg has two stations on the RandstadRail lines. RandstadRail is the official name for a light rail project connecting the cities of The Hague, Rotterdam and Zoetermeer. These lines use former train routes, which are now converted for use by light rail vehicles. 
It is a somewhat confusing name as for travelers RandstadRail is only used for tram 3 and 4 to Zoetermeer. The line to Rotterdam is exploited as a branch of the Rotterdam metro: Rotterdam metro line E. 
Stations in Leidschendam-Voorburg (for both trams and metro) are Voorburg 't Loo and Leidschendam-Voorburg. RandstadRail also stops at Den Haag Laan van NOI train station.

Bus and tram
There are two major bus services running through this municipality. They are HTM and EBS.
Several tram trajectories through Leidschendam-Voorburg - run by HTM - connect various parts of the city with each other, as well as with various neighbouring cities.

Roads
Leidschendam-Voorburg is connected to the A4 (Amsterdam - Belgian border by Rotterdam) and A12 (The Hague - German border by Utrecht) motorways, which cross each other near the city center of Voorburg.

The N14 dual carriageway, which connects the A4 at Leidschendam to the N44 dual carriageway at Wassenaar runs through a series of tunnels in the municipality.

Together with a part of motorway A4 and several local roads the N14 forms the Ring Den Haag.

Cycle paths
Like every Dutch municipality, Leidschendam-Voorburg provides a wide range of facilities for cyclers. As an example, on the eastern edge, there are two large cycle bridges that cross different roads and ditches.

Notable people

Public thinking & Public Service 
 Jan van Valckenborgh (ca.1575 in Voorburg − 1624) a military engineer who built fortresses
 Barbera van Meerten-Schilperoort (1778 in Geestbrug – 1853) a Dutch women's rights activist
 Guillaume Groen van Prinsterer (1801 in Voorburg – 1876) a Dutch politician and historian 
 Jacobus Aarden (1914-1997) lived much of his life and died in Voorburg. A member of the municipal council of Voorburg for 20 years, member of House of Representatives
 Willem Scholten (1927 – 2005 in Leidschendam) a politician, held several ministerial offices
 Jan Broekman (born 1931 in Voorburg) a philosopher, legal and social scientist, lives in Belgium
 Theo van Boven (born 1934 in Voorburg) a jurist and professor emeritus in international law
 Jan de Leeuw (born 1945 in Voorburg) a Dutch statistician, psychometrician and academic
 Johannes Willibrordus Maria Hendriks (born 1954 in Leidschendam) the Auxiliary Bishop-elect of the Roman Catholic Diocese of Haarlem-Amsterdam since 2011
 Maxime Verhagen (born 1956) a retired Dutch politician, Deputy Prime Minister 2010/2012, lives in Voorburg
 Father Roderick Vonhögen (born 1968 in Leidschendam) a Roman Catholic priest, podcaster and new media producer
 Carla Dik-Faber (born 1971 in Voorburg) a Dutch art historian and politician

The Arts 
 Jacob Elias la Fargue (1735–1778) & Karel la Fargue (1738–1793), brothers and painters 
 Marcellus Emants (1848 in Voorburg – 1923) a Dutch naturalist novelist
 Cornelis Rol (1877-1963) a Dutch graphic artist, painter, lithographer and illustrator; lived and worked in Voorburg from 1929
 Willem van Genk (1927 in Voorburg – 2005) a Dutch painter and graphic artist of Outsider Art 
 Xander de Buisonjé (born 1973 in Voorburg) a Dutch singer and TV presenter
 Hans van Hemert (born 1945 in Voorburg) a Dutch record producer and songwriter 
 Toon Verhoef (born 1946 in Voorburg) a Dutch painter, ceramist and art lecturer
 Johan de Meij (born 1953 in Voorburg) a Dutch conductor, trombonist and composer
 Frans Schrofer (born 1956 in Voorburg) a Dutch furniture designer and industrial designer 
 Ariane Schluter (born 1966 in Voorburg) a Dutch film actress

Sport 
 Bertha Brouwer (1930 in Leidschendam – 2006) a Dutch sprinter, silver medallist at the 1952 Summer Olympics
 Christiaan van Velzen (born 1932 in Voorburg) a retired Dutch shooter, competed at the 1980 Summer Olympics
 Gerben Karstens (born 1942 in Voorburg) a former professional racing cyclist, won a team gold medal at the 1964 Summer Olympics
 André Stafleu (born 1955 in Leidschendam) a retired Dutch footballer with over 350 club caps
 Peter Blangé (born 1964 in Voorburg) a retired volleyball player, team silver and gold medallist in the 1992 and 1996 Summer Olympics 
 Edwin Vurens (born 1968 in Stompwijk) a Dutch football manager and former international player with 268 club caps
 Maurits Crucq (born 1968 in Voorburg) a former field hockey defender, team bronze and gold medallist in the 1988 and 1996 Summer Olympics 
 Maarten van der Linden (born 1969 in Voorburg) a former rower, team silver medallist at the 1996 Summer Olympics
 Sander van Gessel (born 1976 in Leidschendam) a Dutch footballer with 280 club caps
 Pascal Matla (born 1981 in Leidschendam) a former American football player, grew up in Voorburg
 Daan van Bunge (born 1982 in Voorburg) a Dutch cricketer
 Cees Juffermans (born 1982) is a former Dutch short track speed skater, competed at the 2002 and 2006 Winter Olympics
 Eljero Elia (born 1987 in Voorburg) a Dutch footballer with over 300 club caps
 Darius van Driel (born 1989 in Leidschendam) a Dutch professional golfer who plays on the Challenge Tour
 Daryl Janmaat (born 1989 in Leidschendam) a professional footballer with over 300 club caps
 Inge Janssen (born 1989 in Voorburg) a Dutch rower, team silver medallist at the 2016 Summer Olympics
 Dylan van Baarle (born 1992 in Voorburg), Dutch cyclist, winner of Paris-Roubaix and Omloop Het Nieuwsblad, silver medallist in the 2021 world championships

Gallery

References

External links

Official website

 
Municipalities of South Holland
Populated places in South Holland
Municipalities of the Netherlands established in 2002